Tanjong Malim, or Tanjung Malim, is a town in Muallim District, Perak, Malaysia. It lies on the Perak-Selangor state border, with Sungai Bernam serving as the natural divider.

Today, "Tanjong Malim" usually refers to the territory under administration of Tanjong Malim District Council or Majlis Daerah Tanjong Malim (MDTM), which includes the smaller towns adjacent to the town such as Proton City, Behrang, Behrang 2020, Sungkai and Slim River. "Tanjong Malim" is lately also referred to the Old Town and New Town divided by the KTM Komuter rail at its heart, from which the town grew. Commuter train services from Tanjong Malim started on 1 June 2009.

History and background

Name
An early settlement nearby Sungai Bernam is named Kampung Kubu (Fort Village). The Bugis community planted jambu fruit trees along the river bank. As population grew over time, the area is referred to as Kampung Jambu. A mosque is also built to cater its Muslim community. During a visit by a British Straits of Settlements official, Sir List, the state officials headed by Raja Itam referred the area as Tanjong, as quoted by its local ulama Tuan Haji Mustafa bin Raja Kemala. However, it is also known locally as Kg.Kubu, Kg.Bugis, Kg.Jambu and Tg.Jambu. Hence, Sir List 'officially' named it as Tanjong Malim to avoid confusion. (Malim or mualim refers to the pious local Muslim community)

History

In the early AD 1700, a Bugis settlement was established along the riverbank of Sungai Bernam, as part of Raja Kecil's plan to set up one of its kubu, fort along the river to fend off the northern Perak Sultanate threat. The plan fell apart with the fall of Raja Kecil in Johor Sultanate power struggle. Over the century, the small village known as Kampung Kubu/Bugis remained idle or rather isolated.

Around 1766, Perak Sultan Mahmud Shah crowned the Bugis prince Lumu as Sultan Salahuddin Shah to establish the Selangor Sultanate. Sungai Bernam is agreed as the natural border and this tiny village happens to be divided by it. Today, the Selangor side is known as Ulu Bernam while the Perak side is Tanjong Malim.

The 1875, Klang War in Selangor drove the Malay community to reside at this rather peaceful village. The Gee Hin-Hai San triads conflict in Ipoh also drew the Chinese community to this village.
In the early 1900s, the Chinese Hokkien clan built two rows of shop houses which formed the pillar of the town. These old shop houses still exist today along Jalan Besar in Tanjong Malim. Lately, it is referred to as the "old town" as current development concentrates more on the northern area.
The British also brought in the Indian community to work in the rubber plantation, which is the town's most important agriculture sector income during the colonial rule. The Mogah community also set up its petty trade in the outskirt of the town.

Major development took place as infrastructures were upgraded. e.g. railway station, bus station, tarred roads, a federal trunk road, schools, district hospital, etc.
In 1922, the Sultan Idris Training College was built there, (first education training institution in Malaysia). The SITC expanded over decades (to MPSI, IPSI, UPSI) and is now a public university, Sultan Idris Education University. A polytechnic was also established recently, granting the town the nickname Town of Education.

The Second World War put a halt to the town's development. The most intensely fought gun battle during the Malaya conquest took place at Slim River, nearby here. The Japanese invaders took over and SITC field became a gruesome POW execution site. After the war, the town population was further diminished during the Malayan Emergency. The British colonial government declared Tanjong Malim as a "black town" in an effort to combat the pro-independence guerrillas of the MNLA, led by the Malayan Communist Party. A local district office is also built here, governing the nearby settlements within 30 km radius. But the assassination of Sir Cordner promptly forced the British to move the office to Slim River.

After the 1957 independence, Tanjong Malim is a rather sleepy town. Most Malaysian would only recall this town as a stop-over rest area during long haul travels between Ipoh and Kuala Lumpur. The great flood in 1970 further dampened the town development. In the 1990s, there were plan to push Tanjong Malim to become a buffer city with mega projects such as Proton City and Diamond Creeks. However, the 1997 worldwide economy meltdown put a big comma to it.

Recently, Tanjong Malim is back on track. The Proton City project is turned on, and coupled with the Bernam Jaya projects, a City status could be foreseen in a matter of time.

Additional notes
 The 1st shop lot was built in 1901.
 The 1st tar road was Jalan Besar, built in 1920.
 The 1st traffic light is at the Route1-Jln Besar junction. It was set up in 1985.
 The 1st fly-over is the PLUS interchange built in 2000.

City layout

The following towns, suburbs, and neighborhoods comprise the area formally
(collectively) known as the Mukim Tanjong Malim. (Source: Majlis Daerah Tanjong Malim )

 Tanjong Malim
 Behrang
 Behrang Ulu
 Behrang 2020
 Bernam Jaya
 Kg.Kelawar
 Proton City
 Slim
 Slim River
 Sungkai
 Trolak

Population
Tanjong Malim is a small town in Perak.
In Batang Padang, it is 3rd largest after Tapah and Bidor, just ahead of Slim River.

 Population = 60,791 (2007)
 Urban area population = 16,399 (2008)
 Ranking: 69th most populous urban centre in Malaysia.

Places of interest

 Sungai Bil
 Sungai Slim
 Strata Falls
 Tibang Fall
 Lon Waterfalls
 Lubuk Kawah Falls, the river boundary between Perak & Selangor
 National Education Museum
 Tanjong Malim Street Art
 UPSI Adventure Park

Automotive
 Proton City – Proton manufacturing plant

Sports
 Kompleks Sukan Proton Tanjong Malim
 Padang Besar UPSI
 Dewan MDTM

Transportation

Public transport
 Railway

 Tanjung Malim station serves Tanjong Malim town, providing KTM ETS and Komuter services. The Tanjong Malim constituency also contains another three stations in Behrang, Slim River and Sungkai, with only limited ETS and freight services.
 Bus

Bus Station Tanjong Malim (Cap:400ppl)
 Air
There is no airway in Tanjong Malim, only airfields for helicopters.

Car

 Trunk roads
The old interstate Route Federal Route 1 (Federal Highway) connecting Ipoh – Kuala Lumpur, is the main thoroughfare in Tanjong Malim constituency.
 Tolled expressways
North–South Expressway Northern Route exit 121. Though named as Tanjong Malim Interchange, it is actually located in Ulu Bernam, Selangor.

Arts, entertainment, and culture
Movies filmed in Tanjong Malim include:
 A Tree in Tanjung Malim By Tan Chui Mui, Best Foreign Short Film, Entre Veus Belford.
Principal Award, 51st Oberhausen International Short Film Festival
 A Thug from Tanjong Malim By Iki Liew, slated for 2009 release.

References

External links
 Municipal Council

Muallim District
Towns in Perak